Tirucalladienol synthase (PEN3) is an enzyme with systematic name (3S)-2,3-epoxy-2,3-dihydrosqualene mutase (cyclizing, tirucalla-7,24-dien-3beta-ol-forming). This enzyme catalyses the following chemical reaction

 (3S)-2,3-epoxy-2,3-dihydrosqualene  tirucalla-7,24-dien-3beta-ol

The product from Arabidopsis thaliana is tirucalla-7,24-dien-3beta-ol.

References

Daravana Bhoot - Cartoon Story 
 

EC 5.4.99